The 2017 CARIFTA Games took place between 15 and 17 April 2017. The event was held at the Ergilio Hato Stadium in Willemstad, Curaçao. A report of the event was given by the IAAF.

Austin Sealy Award 

Medal summary

Boys U-20 (Junior) 

†: Open event for both junior and youth athletes.

Girls U-20 (Junior)

†: Open event for both junior and youth athletes.

Boys U-18 (Youth)

Girls U-18 (Youth)

Medal table

References

External links 
Official website
Official results

CARIFTA Games
CARIFTA Games
CARIFTA Games
CARIFTA Games
CARIFTA Games
International sports competitions hosted by Curaçao
April 2017 sports events in North America